Hypselobarbus thomassi (the red Canarese barb) is a critically endangered species of ray-finned fish in the genus Hypselobarbus. It is endemic to the Western Ghats in Karnataka and Kerala, India. This species is potentially a very large fish, growing to  TL, possibly even larger.

References 

Freshwater fish of India
Endemic fauna of the Western Ghats
Fish described in 1874